Leeann Tweeden is an American radio broadcaster, model and sports commentator. She is co-host of Dr. Drew Midday Live on Radio 790 KABC in Los Angeles.

Early life 
Tweeden was born in Manassas, Virginia, to Bill Tweeden, a retired Air Force Chief Mechanic, and his wife Catherine. She is of Filipino descent on her mother's side. After graduating from Osbourn Park High School in 1991, Tweeden moved to Hollywood to pursue a career in modeling.

Career 
In 1992, while working as a hostess at a Hooters restaurant in Colorado Springs, Colorado, she won first place in the Venus International Model Search. This break led to national exposure, including a regular role as a fitness model on the TV show Fitness Beach. Tweeden modeled for promotional work for Hooters (which included an appearance in the restaurant's 1994 calendar), Venus International, and Frederick's of Hollywood. In the early 2000s, Tweeden hosted many segments of the Fox Sports Net show, Bluetorch TV. Tweeden was a correspondent for Fox Sports Networks' The Best Damn Sports Show Period from 2001 to 2007. In 2008, Tweeden became the third hostess of the NBC late night television series Poker After Dark. She has also appeared on the political discussion series Hannity in 2011 and 2012. She was a member of the "Great American Panel" and also occasionally appeared on the panel of Red Eye w/ Greg Gutfeld. Tweeden was seen in pre- and post-game coverage of the Los Angeles Angels of Anaheim on Fox Sports West and on Fox Sports 1's UFC Tonight, with Kenny Florian and Ariel Helwani.

On February 7, 2017, Tweeden joined the cast of the Los Angeles morning radio show McIntyre in the Morning on KABC, 790 AM as the news anchor.

On January 7, 2019, Tweeden became the co-host of Dr. Drew Midday on KABC, 790 AM.

Appearances 
In August 1996, Tweeden appeared on the cover of Playboy magazine and as part of a fitness model pictorial for that issue. She did not appear nude. In December 2011, at 38 years old, she again appeared on the cover of Playboy, this time in a nude pictorial.

In 2002, she was a guest character in the motocross video game Freekstyle as a motocross rider. The March 2007 issue of FHM (the final U.S. issue ever printed) featured Tweeden as the cover girl. As part of Hooters' 25th anniversary in 2008, she was named among "The Top Hooters Girls of all time".

Since 2002, Tweeden has participated in 16 tours with the USO including 12 to Afghanistan and Iraq.

Allegations against Al Franken

On October 30, 2017, California Congresswoman Jackie Speier was interviewed by the McIntyre show about a sexual assault that occurred when she was in her 20s and was a congressional staffer for Representative Leo Ryan. She reported Ryan's chief of staff  "kissed me and stuck his tongue in my mouth". McIntyre said that led to a conversation with Tweeden about an alleged incident between her and Minnesota U.S. Senator Al Franken. Two weeks later, Republican operative Roger Stone wrote, "It’s Al Franken's 'time in the barrel.' Franken next in long list of Democrats to be accused of 'grabby' behavior." Following the posting of Tweeden's story, far-right radio show host and prominent conspiracy theorist. Alex Jones, broadcast that Stone had told him, in advance, "Get ready. Franken’s next". Stone told author and New Yorker reporter Jane Mayer that a Fox broadcasting executive, a friend of Tweeden had advised him of the story.

On November 16, 2017, Tweeden gave an interview to 790 KABC and wrote in a post on its website that Franken behaved inappropriately toward her when the two were on a 2006 USO tour to the Middle East. Tweeden stated that Franken, who in 2008 had been elected to the Senate from Minnesota, insisted that they rehearse the kiss that appeared in the script for a skit in the USO show: "I said 'OK' so he would stop badgering me. We did the line leading up to the kiss and then he came at me, put his hand on the back of my head, mashed his lips against mine and aggressively stuck his tongue in my mouth." She said she pushed him away, feeling "disgusted and violated". Tweeden wrote that Franken also posed for a photograph with her while she was asleep on the C-17 cargo plane flying home. According to The Washington Post, the photograph, "shows Franken looking into a camera, his hands either over or on Tweeden’s chest as she slept".  A subsequent review of the photo revealed that it may have been a parody of a skit that had been used in the USO show's comedy routine. In the skit, Franken appears as a doctor who informs Tweeden's character that "a woman your age should have a complete breast examination every year"; Franken then approaches her with his arms outstretched and his hands aimed at her chest.

Although Tweeden stated "he wrote that sketch just to kiss me", it was later confirmed that the same kissing skit had been performed on the USO tour by several other actresses in previous years. It had been intended as a throwback to the Bob Hope/Raquel Welch USO skits of the Vietnam era. Numerous witnesses on that tour recalled that Tweeden had performed the skit on multiple occasions. CNBC's John Harwood said in defense of Franken, referring to a video taken of her "humping" a surprised, married comedian Robin Williams on a similar 2004 USO tour, "[T]hat pic was obviously a joke, not groping, just like Leeann Tweeden wrapping her leg around Robin Williams and smacking his butt; entertainment for soldiers deployed overseas is raunchy like that." Franken responded, saying: "I certainly don't remember the rehearsal for the skit in the same way, but I send my sincerest apologies to Leeann. [...] As to the photo, it was clearly intended to be funny but wasn't. I shouldn't have done it." He issued a longer apology later, which Tweeden accepted. Other accusations of sexual misconduct—including grabbing a woman's bottom while posing for a photo—followed Tweeden's. Franken resigned from the Senate on January 2, 2018.

Personal life
Tweeden met her husband, Chris Dougherty, a pilot for the California Air National Guard, during a USO tour. They married in 2010. They have two children, son Kane and daughter Kaia.

She considers herself fiscally conservative and said that she voted twice for President George W. Bush.

Tweeden made an appearance on the season 10 finale of That Metal Show.

See also
 Deanna Merryman, a fellow model who attended high school with Tweeden.

Notes

References

External links

 
 
 Dr. Drew Midday Live with Leeann Tweeden

Al Franken
Female models from Virginia
American television personalities
American women television personalities
Hooters people
Living people
People from Manassas, Virginia
American models of Filipino descent
American women journalists
American writers of Filipino descent
Journalists from Virginia
Osbourn Park High School alumni
Year of birth missing (living people)